Nepal Bhasa renaissance (Nepal Bhasa: नेपालभाषा पुनर्जागरण) was the movement to revive and modernize the Nepal Bhasa language during the period 1909 to 1941. The movement was spontaneous and not orchestrated. However, the sum total of activities conducted during this era had a profound impact on the overall course of the language development.

Factors and influences
Many factors had an impact in the Nepal Bhasa renaissance, including:
 the repression of Nepal Bhasa and its banning from official use by the Rana regime;
 the first generation of modern Nepalese scholars' attempts to modernize the Nepal Bhasa language;
 Hindu and Buddhist literary movements in India and Nepal;
 The regional language movement of Bengal

Renaissance figures
The most prominent people of this era were 
Nisthananda Bajracharya
Siddhidas Mahaju 
Jagat Sundar Malla 
Yogbir Singh Kansakar 
Shukraraj Shastri, one of the four martyrs of the Nepalese revolution that toppled the Rana regime
Dharmaditya Dharmacharya

Nisthananda, Siddhidas, Jagat Sundar and Yogbir Singh are considered as the Four Pillars of Nepal Bhasa.

Activities
Various activities marked the renaissance era.

Publication
Nisthananda Bajracharya authored and printed the first printed book in Nepal Bhasa called Ek Binshati Pragyaparmita in 1909. He brought printing type from Kolkata, did the typesetting, proof-reading and printing himself.

Standardization of grammar

Sukraraj Shastri published the first grammar book in Nepal Bhasa (in N.S. 1048, Kaulaathwa 10) called "Nepalbhasa byakaran". Before that, grammar was limited to manuscripts and traditional teachings with wide variability. This publication initiated a standardization of grammar. Publication of Nepal Bhasa reader aided in further standardization of vocabulary.

The publication of dictionary and English-Nepal Bhasa translation by Jagat Sundar Malla helped in standardization of vocabulary.

Translation
To increase the literary treasure of the language, translations of various literature was initiated in this era. Some of them are as follows
Lalitvistara, a Sanskrit Buddhist text based on the Buddha's life story was translated by Nisthananda Bajracharya, one of the four pillars of Nepal Bhasa during this era. 
Hindu epic Ramayan by Siddhidas Mahaju, 
Aesop's fables by Jagat Sundar Malla

Education
Jagat Sundar Malla was a pioneer of modern education. He turned his own house into a free school. To overcome the lack of teaching materials, he wrote many course books himself, including an English-Nepal Bhasa-English dictionary and translated Aesop's Fables in 1915 into Nepal Bhasa. Poet Yogbir Singh Kansakar stressed female education.

Research
Scientific research on the language began in this period. It was identified that Nepal Bhasa is a Sino-Tibetan language and not an Indo-Aryan language (as was believed) in this era. Various ancient manuscripts were collected and researched during this era.

Literature
Modern literature was introduced into Nepal Bhasa during this era. Modern prose and poetry were established and epic writing were firmly reestablished during this era.

Activism and identity
Renaissance marked the revival of the term "Nepal Bhasa" to name the language rather than the Khas imposed term "Newari". Figures like Dhammaditya Dhammacharya were active and conscious about the proper nomenclature of the language.

Literary samples
Some of the lines from Sajjan Hridayabharan of Siddhidas Mahaju (N.S.987-N.S.1050) read as follows

सज्जन मनुष्या संगतनं मूर्ख नापं भिना वै
पलेला लपते ल वंसा म्वति थें ल सना वै 

which state that even a moron can improve with the company of good people just like even a drop of water appears like a pearl when it descends upon the leaves of a lotus plant.

Impact
Much of the literary activities conducted in modern era were a propagation of the activities initiated in this era. The era created a new breed of modern writers. Unlike medieval era or dark era writers, these writers were commoners and not aristocrats. Hence, literature reached the grass-roots level of society. Some of the most prominent impacts of the activities of this era are 
The epic Sugata Saurabha by Chittadhar Hridaya is the greatest epic written in the language along the lines of Nisthananda Bajracharya.
The Nepal Bhasa movement which helped establish Nepal Bhasa as a national language of Nepal after the 2006 democratic movement was along the lines of the movement of Dharmaditya Dharmacharya.

See also
Nepal alphabets
Nepal Bhasa literature
Nepal Bhasa journalism
 Buddha Dharma wa Nepal Bhasa (magazine)
 Dharmodaya
 Revolution of 1951

References

Newar language
Language revival